Pride Scotia is Scotland's national LGBT pride festival. Since 1995, volunteers have organised a Pride March and a community-based festival in June, alternating between the cities of Edinburgh and Glasgow.

Between 1995 and 2002, the pride marches were organised by Pride Scotland Limited, until it went bust in December 2002 with debts of around £60,000. A new organisation, AL D ltd was founded in 2003 to continue the tradition of the annual march and festival. This organisation changed its name to Pride Scotia (Edinburgh) in 2004 and a separate organisation Pride Scotia (Glasgow) was created with the two organisations organising Pride Scotia in their respective cities in alternate years thereafter. Pride Scotia Edinburgh is a company limited by guarantee whilst Pride Glasgow is now a Scottish Charitable Incorporated Organisation. In 2008, the Glasgow arm of the organisation announced it was splitting completely, and has since used the name Pride Glasgow.

History
The precursor event to Pride Scotia was called Lark in the Park. It was organised by the Scottish Homosexual Rights Group and first held in 1988  Edinburgh’s Princes Street gardens and again in 1989 and 1992.

In 1991 there was a Scottish Pride event held in Edinburgh on 22 June. It started with a picnic on Calton Hill followed by a march, along the pavement, from Waterloo Place to the bottom of the Mound at the National Gallery.

In 1994, Laura Norris and Doogie Hothersall, both members of the University of Edinburgh LGBT society "BLOGS", decided to organise a Pride Parade to take place in the city of Edinburgh.

Pride 1995
The first Pride Scotia march in Scotland gathered on Barony Street in Edinburgh on 17 June. Police estimated that around 3000 people attended. The route followed was Broughton Street, Leith Street, Princes Street, the Mound, George IV Bridge, and down Middle Meadow Walk into the Meadows. The first Pride Festival on the Meadows began as the procession arrived, and had a stage and surrounding stalls. It continued regardless of the rain, finishing as scheduled at 9pm.  The cleanup took almost the entire Sunday and around 20 volunteers.

Pride 1996
The second Pride march in Scotland was held in Glasgow on 22 June, finishing with a festival on Glasgow Green. Guests included Quentin Crisp.

Pride 1997
The third Pride march in Scotland was held in Edinburgh, with the festival again on the Meadows on 21 June. This year was the first year to include a minute's silence, followed by a minute's noise to mark the effects of AIDS and HIV on the LGBT communities in Scotland. The tradition has been repeated year by year since, led by the Sisters of Perpetual Indulgence.

Guest stars at the festival included Mary Kiani, Labi Siffre and Glasgow Gay Men's Chorus. The three Scottish women's drumming groups amalgamated for the festival: SheBoom from Glasgow, Commotion from Edinburgh and Elles Belles from Dundee.

Pride 1998
On 13 June, the fourth march began in Blythswood Square and ended at Glasgow Green, where the festival took place. The Glasgow women's drumming group, SheBoom, led the march. The Pride Scotland banner for 1998 was carried by George Galloway, Tommy Sheridan, and Louise Fyfe.

Guest stars at the festival included Jimmy Somerville, Karen Dunbar, Carol Laula, Horse, Lorraine Jordan, Kate Copstick, and Huffty.

Pride 1999
Keeping with tradition, this year's Pride was held in Edinburgh, on 19 June. Assembly in East London Street. In keeping with the two previous Edinburgh prides, the route followed was Broughton Street, Leith Street, Princes Street, the Mound, George IV Bridge, and down Middle Meadow Walk into the Meadows. The route passed the then-current home of the Scottish Parliament, and the headquarters of the Bank of Scotland, which had earlier that year been the scene of protests against the Pat Robertson deal. The lesbian drummer band Commotion, near the head of the procession, ceased playing in silent protest as the march passed the bank, and many marchers followed an informal call to "boo the bank".

The festival was held in the Meadows: the theme for this year's festival was Celebrate Diversity and included the introduction of the Diversity Area.

Pride 2000
Pride was held in Glasgow much later than usual this year, on 2 September.

Pride 2001
Pride held in Edinburgh on 23 June.

Pride 2002
Pride held in Glasgow on 22 June. The march began in Blythswood Square and ended in Glasgow Green where rain helped to shrink numbers below financial viability for what was the first (and only) festival to have an admission charge.

Guest speakers at the festival on Glasgow Green included Tommy Sheridan, Dorothy Grace Elder, and Roseanne Foyer from the Scottish TUC.

Pride 2003
This year, the march took place in Edinburgh on 19 July. Following the bankruptcy of Pride Scotland, this was the first year that Pride was organised by Pride Scotia. The festival was held in various locations along Leith Walk, including a sports day in Gayfield Square and a Health and Community Fair in Club eGo on Picardy Place.

Pride 2004
This year, the march took place in Glasgow on 1 July. The festival was held in Glasgow Green.

Pride 2005
On 25 June, the march took place in Edinburgh, from East Market Street to Broughton Street. A Health and Community Fair was held in Club eGo on Picardy Place. Other associated events included an exhibition of AIDS/HIV commemoration quilts and a programme of LGBT films in the Filmhouse.

Pride 2006
On 24 June, thousands took part in a march through Glasgow city centre ending in the festival at  George Square. There was a small controversy with ten firemen refusing to hand out leaflets.

Pride 2007
On 23 June, the march and festival took place in Edinburgh. Due to bad weather the march was rerouted at the last minute to bypass The Mound. The march ran from East Market Street, via Princes Street, St Andrew Square, and Broughton Street and concluded in Pilrig Park where a Tented Village included marquees for Community, Youth, Performance, Men, etc.

Pride 2008
This year, when Pride was to be held in Glasgow, the organisers announced they would be splitting from Pride Scotia, forming their own organisation, which they called Pride Glasgow. Pride Scotia will still continue to run in Edinburgh every 2 years as it has done previously. The re-launched festival was held on 30 August 2008 and was attended by approx 5000 people, and involved a march from Blythswood Square to George Square with a rally and speeches from Nicola Sturgeon deputy first minister, Irfan Rabbani Glasgow City Council Equalities spokesperson Bruce Fraser Chief Executive of Gay Men's Health and Patrick Harvie MSP and leader of the Scottish Green Party.

Pride 2010
This was the first year Pride was held in both Glasgow and Edinburgh. The Edinburgh arm was held on 26 June, and the Glasgow arm on 17 July.

Pride 2015
Pride 2015 was held in Glasgow Green. There was a main stage which featured performances from Heather Peace, George Bowie, Union J and Katrina and the Waves.

Pride 2017
Pride 2017 was held on 19 and 20 August 2017 at Glasgow Green. The annual parade took place on Saturday 19 August 2017 from Glasgow Green at 12pm.

Pride Awards

The Pride Awards have been presented at the annual Pride festival each year since 1998.

The Pride Awards acknowledge the people and the work accomplished in Scotland over the past twelve months, in the name of promoting equality, tolerance and respect.

There are six award categories; Activism; Health; Art & Entertainment;  Culture; Pride Scotia; and The 'Friend for Life' Award.

Ian Dunn Memorial Award for Activism

 1998: Tim Hopkins, Equality Network
 1999: Magie Meager, Equal Opportunities Officer for West Dunbartonshire Council
 2000: Scrap the Section Campaign
 2001: Mags Mackie
 2002: Ali Jarvis
 2003: Patrick Harvie MSP
 2004: Margaret Smith MSP
 2005: Ailsa Spindler - Equality Network
 2006: The Granite Sisters, Aberdeen

Jackie Forster Memorial Award for Culture
The winner of this award is nominated by Glasgow Women's Library. The award is a memorial to Jackie Forster.

 1998: Glasgow Women's Library
 1999: Lesbian Archive and Information Centre
 2000: Laura Norris
 2001: BiGLes Youth
 2002: The List
 2003: Edwin Morgan
 2004: Lucinda Broadbent
 2005: OurStory Scotland / Remember When
 2006: Rachel Jury

Award for Health
The winner of this award is nominated by PHACE Scotland.
 1998: Reach Out Highland
 1999: Steve Retson Project
 2000: Stonewall Youth
 2001: Sappho – Lesbian Health Service
 2002: Parents Enquiry Scotland
 2003: Alastair Pringle, NHS Inclusion
 2004: Tuesday Bath St AA Group
 2005: Waverley Care
 2006: Liz McCann from Lanarkshire HIV AIDS and Hepatitis Centre

Award for Art and Entertainment
The winner of this award is nominated by The List.
 1998: Lorenzo Mele MCT Theatre Co.
 1999: Horse - Singer and Songwriter
 2000: Glasgay!
 2001: OOT, hosted by Craig Hill at The Stand Comedy Club
 2002: Glasgow Film Theatre
 2003: David Leddy
 2004: Burly
 2005: Steven Thomson, Glasgay! Producer
 2006: Ellen Galford and Brian Thompson, organisers of the Rainbow City Exhibition at the City Art Centre in Edinburgh

The Pride Scotia Award
The winner of this award is nominated by the festival organisers.

 Ken Livingstone
 Phil Carvosso
 Glasgow LGBT Centre
 Gordon Creelie - charity fundraising
 2006: David Thomas, Coordinator Director, Strathclyde Gay and Lesbian Switchboard

The "Friend for Life" Award
The winner of this award is nominated by the Equality Network, to someone outside the LGBT community who has worked for LGBT rights in Scotland.

 1999: Rab McNeil (The Scotsman), for his outstanding work on the Pat Robertson story.
 2000: Nora Radcliffe MSP
 2001: Rt. Rev. Richard Holloway
 2002: Chief Insp. Gavin Buist of Lothian and Borders Police
 2003: Helena Scott (Age Concern Scotland)
 2004: Very Rev. Prof. Iain Torrance
 2005: Pauline McNeill MSP
 2006: Paul Parr, Deputy Registrar General at the General Register Office, Edinburgh

Controversies

Ian Dunn paedophile activism
In January 2007 it emerged that one of Pride Scotia's awards had been named to commemorate Ian Dunn, a founder member of banned paedophile activist group the Paedophile Information Exchange. PIE was established to promote acceptance and understanding of adults having sex with children and sought to change the law to legalise paedophilia.

Upon receiving the Iann Dunn Memorial Award in 2006, politician Margaret Smith demanded that it was renamed, threatening to return the award should this not occur. She stated: "I was totally and utterly unaware of the allegations when I accepted the award and I am very upset. Obviously I absolutely condemn paedophilia and anyone who is apologist for it." MSP Patrick Harvie, a previous  recipient of the award, also suggested it should be renamed.

References

External links
 Pride Scotia - official website: includes photos of past Prides
 The Gay Directory - Pride Scotia
 Remember When interviews - Doogie Hothersall, organiser of the first Pride Scotland festival
 Pride Glasgow - New Website of Pride Glasgow the New Pride Event

Festivals in Edinburgh
Pride parades in Scotland
Scottish awards
1995 establishments in Scotland
Summer events in Scotland
Festivals in Glasgow
LGBT culture in Glasgow